Home Instead Senior Care UK is a network of franchises specialising relationship-led domiciliary care for the elderly, in support of aging in place. It is a franchise of Home Instead Senior Care based in Nebraska, founded in 1994, which was acquired by Honor Technology, based in San Francisco, in August 2021. It has 210 franchised offices across the UK, employing more than 13,000 people.  It was one of the 20 most recommended providers in the Home Care Awards 2019.  It achieved an overall rating of 9.9 out of 10.

Martin Jones, based in Stretton, Warrington is the CEO. He is also involved with Business in the Community He sees the company as a major provider of community-based care in line with the strategy outlined in the NHS Long Term Plan. He spoke at the Future of Care conference in London in March 2019, discussing the place of robotics in senior care.

The firm is particularly interested in the use of assistive technology, and has formed a partnership with Anthropos Digital Care which provides smart sensors in the home. These can form a picture of the activities of an older person and generate alerts and actionable insights.  It was piloted at four of the firms franchises in 2018.  In August 2020 the firm launched a three-year research partnership with the University of York’s Social Policy Research Unit.

Performance
In 2020 the organisation had 64 Care Quality Commission ‘outstanding’ ratings across England.  This was more than 25% of its English network, which compared to an average 3% in the social care sector.  In 2019, it was congratulated by the chief inspector of Adult Social Care.  They won the Queen's Award for Enterprise: Innovation (2016).  At that time they had 56 offices and in 2019 they had 195, with about 10,500 clients and about 9,500 caregivers.   Jones was appointed to the board of trustees at The Silver Line in March 2019.  Staff are matched with clients that share their interests, and all home visits are at least an hour.

It was awarded the Princess Royal Training Award in 2016 and 2019.

In December 2020 it was named the UK’s number one franchise business in the Elite Franchise Top 100 league table.

Operations

The national office of Home Instead Senior Care UK is based in Warrington. There are 210 franchise offices UK wide.
The franchise in Stockton-on-Tees, Home Instead Cleveland, which was set up in 2014 and is owned and run by a former Stockton Rugby Club player, was rated outstanding by the Care Quality Commission after an inspection in 2018.  The York & Malton franchise was also rated outstanding in 2018. The CQC reported:  ‘The culture at Home Instead Senior Care is exceptionally open, honest and caring, demonstrating a commitment to putting their clients and staff at the heart of everything they do.’  Home Instead Senior Care North Oxfordshire, which provides personal care to 36 people living in their own homes in the community was rated outstanding by the Care Quality Commission in 2019. Their report said "We received overwhelmingly positive feedback from people, relatives and professionals on how staff had developed caring relationships with people and their relatives."  Visits were over an hour, which is unusual in the sector.  Home Instead Senior Care Canary Wharf was inspected in March 2018 and rated outstanding.  The inspector reported that " Two hour minimum visits allowed people and their care workers the opportunity to develop highly positive and caring relationships that took into account people's individual needs and interests."   Comitis L11 Limited, which trades as Home Instead Senior Care Brentwood was inspected in August 2018 and rated outstanding.  It gives personal care to 80 people living in their own homes. The inspector reported that "People were supported to have maximum choice and control of their lives and staff supported them in the least restrictive way possible; the policies and systems in the service supported this practice."  Home Instead Senior Care in Havant, Hampshire was rated outstanding at its first inspection and Debbie Westhead, the Care Quality Commission interim chief inspector for Adult Social Care, said she was delighted to be able to congratulate Home Instead Senior Care for another overall ‘Outstanding’ rating and that the quality of care which their inspectors found was exceptional. Home Instead Bromley was rated outstanding in 2018 and used the resulting publicity to recruit more staff.

The firm was awarded a Five Star Employer award by the human resources company WorkBuzz in December 2018.  Home Instead Bolton made a public commitment to pay the Real Living Wage, £9 an hour, rather than the £8.21 national living wage in March 2019.

In March 2019 the franchise in Ipswich held a nutrition workshop for older people.

The Glasgow North, Glasgow South and Stirling and Falkirk offices reported in September 2020 that the COVID-19 pandemic in the United Kingdom had led to a 50% increase in demand for their live-in care service.

See also
Private healthcare in the United Kingdom

References

Further reading
 Stages of Senior Care: Your Step-by-Step Guide to Making the Best Decisions (paperback), Paul and Lori Hogan, McGraw-Hill, 2009,

External links

Companies based in Warrington
Elderly care
Social care in England
Franchises
Health care companies of England